Spilarctia xanthogastes is a moth in the family Erebidae. It was described by Cheng-Lai Fang in 2000. It is found in Yunnan and Tibet in western China.

References

Moths described in 2000
xanthogastes